Pierre Malcom Guay (March 26, 1848 – February 19, 1899) was a physician, surgeon and political figure in Quebec. He represented Lévis in the House of Commons of Canada from 1885 to 1899 as a Liberal member.

He was born in Saint-Romuald d'Etchemin, Canada East, the son of François Xavier Guay and Marie Adelaide Côté. Guay was educated at the Séminaire de Quebec and the Université Laval, where he received a M.D. In 1874, he married Marie Louise Antoinette Roy. He served on the town council for St-Romuald d'Etchemin and was mayor from 1886 to 1887. Guay was also a governor of the board of physicians and surgeons for Quebec. He was first elected to the House of Commons in an 1885 by-election held after Isidore-Noël Belleau was unseated following an appeal. Guay died in office at the age of 50.

Electoral record

References
 
 The Canadian parliamentary companion, 1891, AJ Gemmill

1848 births
1899 deaths
Members of the House of Commons of Canada from Quebec
Liberal Party of Canada MPs
Mayors of places in Quebec